The Roscommon Zoo is a rural zoo located within South Branch Township in the U.S. state of Michigan.  The zoo is located along M-18 just east of the village of Roscommon.  

It occupies  and has more than 120 domestic and exotic animals.  The zoo is family owned and operated and also has a petting zoo.

References

External links
 Official website

Zoos in Michigan
Buildings and structures in Crawford County, Michigan
Tourist attractions in Crawford County, Michigan